Trésor may refer to

People
Marius Trésor (born 1950), French footballer
Trésor Kandol (born 1981)  Congolese footballer
Tresor Kangambu (born 1987), Qatari footballer 
Trésor Mputu (born 1985), Congolese footballer
Tresor (singer) (born 1987), Congolese singer

Other
Trésor public, the national administration of the Treasury in France
Trésor (album), a 2010 album by Kenza Farah
Tresor (album), a 2022 album by Gwenno
Tresor (club), a German nightclub and record label
:fr:Trésor (film, 2009), a film with Fanny Ardant
:fr:Trésor (parfum), a 1990 perfume by Lancôme
Le Trésor, a 1980 novel by Juliette Benzoni
TRESOR, an encryption system for Linux computers

See also
Renault Trezor